The 1932 Wyoming Cowboys football team was an American football team that represented the University of Wyoming as a member of the Rocky Mountain Conference (RMC) during the 1932 college football season.  In their third and final season under head coach John Rhodes, the Cowboys compiled a 2–6–1 record (1–4–1 against RMC opponents) and were outscored by a total of 137 to 53.

Schedule

References

Wyoming
Wyoming Cowboys football seasons
Wyoming Cowboys football